Melissa York is a rock drummer noted for her work with iconic lesbian bands such as Team Dresch, The Butchies, and Amy Ray. She lives in Durham, North Carolina.

Biography 
York first began drumming with the New York-based hardcore punk bands Born Against, the Manacled, and Vitapup. Following this, she moved to the West Coast to drum for Team Dresch in 1993. When Team Dresch broke up in 1998, York and band-mate Kaia Wilson, together with Alison Martlew, formed the power punk lesbian-feminist band, The Butchies (1998-2005), which put out four albums.

She has remained active in the lesbian and punk music scene, touring with the  Indigo Girls' Amy Ray and playing in a band called The Ex-Members and the band Humble Tripe.

In popular culture
Her name appears in the lyrics of the Le Tigre song "Hot Topic."

References 

1969 births
Living people
American women drummers
American rock drummers
American lesbian musicians
20th-century American drummers
20th-century American women musicians
Feminist musicians
Team Dresch members
The Butchies members
20th-century American LGBT people
21st-century American LGBT people